Red Imps F.C. was a football team from Gibraltar. They last played in the 2015–16 Gibraltar Second Division.

References

Defunct football clubs in Gibraltar
Association football clubs disestablished in 2016